The Hippos were an Australian blues band formed in Sydney in 1985.  The band released three albums in their time together and were nominated for three ARIA Music Awards at the ARIA Music Awards of 1989 for their song "Dark Age"

Band members
The original band members included:
 Leszek (Lez) Karski - guitar, lead vocals.  (Left to join the Bondi Cigars.)
 John Power - bass, lead vocals.
 Ace Follington - drums.  (Left to join the Bondi Cigars.)
 Ian Jones - saxophone, percussion, backing vocals.
 Bridie King - keyboards, percussion, backing vocals.

Other musicians included:
 David McBride - trombone. (Hippocracy)
 Nigel Harris - trumpet. (Hippocracy)
 Tim Reeves - drums.
 Matt Morrison - drums.
 Rory McKibbon - guitar.
 Phil Groves - keyboards.

Discography

Studio albums

Extended plays

Singles

Awards

ARIA Music Awards
The ARIA Music Awards is an annual awards ceremony that recognises excellence, innovation, and achievement across all genres of Australian music. The Hippos were nominated for three awards.

|-
| rowspan="3"| 1989
| "Dark Age"
| ARIA Award for Breakthrough Artist – Single
| 
|-
| Les Karski & Guy Gray for "Dark Age"
| ARIA Award for Producer of the Year
| 
|-
| Guy Gray for "Dark Age"
| ARIA Award for Engineer of the Year
| 
|-

References 

Australian blues musical groups
Musical groups established in 1985